Gerri Lee Lawlor (May 16, 1969 – January 28, 2019) was an American actress, voice actress and homeless advocate.  She was the co-creator, along with Marc Gimbel and Stephen Kearin, of the fictitious Simlish language used in The Sims.

Lawlor was the voice of numerous Sims in The Sims, The Sims Livin' Large, The Sims: House Party, The Sims Makin' Magic, The Sims 2, The Sims Life Stories, The Sims: Superstar, and SimCity 4.

Lawlor played  the "Vanna White" hostess in the 3DO game Twisted.

In her spare time, Lawlor was a homeless advocate. In the #BeRobin campaign of 2014, Lawlor performed improvised music and comedy on the street to raise money for the homeless with Margaret Cho. Some of those performances appeared in the 2016 documentary #BeRobin The Movie by Kurt Weitzmann.

Lawlor starred as Elizabeth Goodman in the deconstructive comedic film Suckerfish in 1999. She was the voice of "The Bully" in the Annie Award-winning animated short Hubert's Brain.

Lawlor was a Company Player at BATS Improv.

Between 2006 - 2007 and in 2011, Gerri Lawlor worked closely as a female vocalist for the anonymous art collective The Residents.

Lawlor died on January 28, 2019, from causes unknown.

Filmography

References

External links

MobyGames' entry on Lawlor

American voice actresses
Place of death missing
American film actresses
Whistlers
Place of birth missing
1969 births
2019 deaths
21st-century American women